Soulshock & Karlin is a duo of Danish record producers and songwriters, Carsten Schack and Kenneth Karlin. They have produced many successful songs, including Monica's "Before You Walk out of My Life", Whitney Houston's "Heartbreak Hotel", JoJo's "Leave (Get Out)", and Toni Braxton's "I Love Me Some Him". In a reference to a famous commercial, Arena Magazine called the team, "Probably the best R&B producers in the world" (March 2001).

Soulshock & Karlin have written and produced hits for many artists such as Brandy, Usher, Monica, Whitney Houston, Luther Vandross, Craig David and Sting in "Rise & Fall", and 2Pac in "Do For Love", "Me Against The World", "I Wonder If Heaven Got A Ghetto", "Old School", and "Baby Don't Cry." Their remix credits include Usher's "U Got It Bad," and "Brokenhearted" by Brandy and Wanya Morris of Boyz II Men.

The duo took a break from working together in 2010 when Soulshock was asked to become a judge on the Danish version of The X Factor before becoming the in-house producer for the U.S. incarnation of the show.  Since reuniting early in 2016 the duo have new songs and productions lining up for release with several major label artists including K Michelle, Marko Penn feat Gucci Mane, Carter Park feat G-Eazy, H.I.M, Luke Christopher, Solo Lucci and several others.

Biography
Soulshock began his career as a hip-hop club DJ, spinning records in his bedroom. His big break came in 1989 when he took third place in the DMC Mixing Championships in London. The contest victory led to a DJ position on the European Tour for Queen Latifah, Jungle Brothers and Chill Rob G. That gig, in turn, gave Soulshock the opportunity to remix songs for Mc Lyte, Queen Latifah among others. With his remixes playing on KIIS-FM, Soulshock came out to New York City to study under DJ Red Alert. But as Soulshock recalls, 'I went back to Denmark, because it was so tough being in New York and I was making no money at all." EMI/Medley had offered Soulshock and his former partner, Cutfather, a label deal in Denmark. In 1990, he opened Soulpower Productions and Records. Moving toward more of an R&B vibe, Soulshock needed a great keyboard player, and found one in Karlin.

A fan of jazz greats such as Bob James and Stanley Clarke, Karlin was an integral part of Denmark's jazz scene before joining with Soulshock producing Patti LaBelle's "All Right Now." A musician in the traditional sense of the word, Karlin says, "I think our different backgrounds are what make our tracks interesting." While the future overseas looked bright, Soulshock & Karlin felt that the brand of R&B/hip-hop they specialized in was being overshadowed in Europe by dance and house music. The duo made the move to Los Angeles and, after months of struggling, finally had a break through with CeCe Peniston. Their single "I'm In The Mood" came out and made some noise. With the ball rolling, Soulshock & Karlin scored their first big hit with Monica's #1 R&B single "Before You Walk Out of My Life," which they wrote and produced. Hits with artists such as Toni Braxton, Brandy, Brownstone, Silk, and 2Pac followed.

In 1999, Soulshock & Karlin enjoyed another #1 single with Whitney Houston's "Heartbreak Hotel" which received two Grammy nominations: Best R&B Song, and Best R&B Performance by a Duo or Vocalist. Soulshock & Karlin recently produced new tracks for Craig David & Sting "Rise and Fall," Blu Cantrell "Don't Wanna Say Goodbye," Monica "Breaks My Heart," "I Wrote This Song," "Hurt the Most" and the first single from American Pop Idol Justin Guarini "Sorry."

Soulshock & Karlin produced and wrote their first #1 top 40 hit “Leave (Get Out)" performed by JoJo, and the #1 R&B song “Truth Is” performed by American Idol winner Fantasia (which also received a Grammy nomination for best R&B album) and tracks for rap star Nelly.  Soulshock and Karlin went on to collaborate with Keyshia Cole, Kelly Rowland, and Samantha Jade and to produce songs for the debut solo albums of Cheryl Cole and 2008 The X Factor winner Alexandra Burke, 3 Words and Overcome respectively.

Singles discography

References

External links
Official website

Danish record producers
Danish songwriters
Record production duos
Songwriting teams
Danish musical duos